Gustaf Arokallio (10 June 1854 - 11 December 1939: surname until 1906 Petterson) was a Finnish Lutheran clergyman and politician, born in Sotkamo. He was a member of the Diet of Finland in 1894 and from 1904 to 1905 and of the Parliament of Finland from 1907 to 1909 and from 1910 to 1919. He represented the Young Finnish Party until 1918 and the National Coalition Party from 1918 to 1919.

References

1854 births
1939 deaths
People from Sotkamo
People from Oulu Province (Grand Duchy of Finland)
20th-century Finnish Lutheran clergy
Members of the Diet of Finland
Members of the Parliament of Finland (1907–08)
Members of the Parliament of Finland (1908–09)
Members of the Parliament of Finland (1910–11)
Members of the Parliament of Finland (1911–13)
Members of the Parliament of Finland (1913–16)
Members of the Parliament of Finland (1916–17)
Members of the Parliament of Finland (1917–19)
Young Finnish Party politicians
National Coalition Party politicians
People of the Finnish Civil War (White side)
University of Helsinki alumni
19th-century Finnish Lutheran clergy